Ante Nardelli (15 April 1937 – 5 September 1995) was Croatian male water polo player. He was a member of the Yugoslavia men's national water polo team. He won the silver medal at the 1964 Summer Olympics. He was also part of the team at the 1960 Summer Olympics, playing seven matches and scoring five goals. On club level he played for Jadran Split in Yugoslavia.

See also
 List of Olympic medalists in water polo (men)

References

External links
 

1937 births
1995 deaths
Croatian male water polo players
Yugoslav male water polo players
Water polo players at the 1960 Summer Olympics
Water polo players at the 1964 Summer Olympics
Olympic water polo players of Yugoslavia
Water polo players from Split, Croatia
Olympic silver medalists for Yugoslavia
Medalists at the 1964 Summer Olympics
Olympic medalists in water polo